Sali Çekaj (22 June 1956 – 19 April 1999) was a Kosovo Albanian commander of the Armed Force of Republic of Kosovo (FARK) and Kosovo Liberation Army (KLA). He was killed in action on 19 April 1999 at the Battle of Košare, during the fighting with Yugoslav forces. After the Kosovo War, he was declared Hero of Kosovo. 

Sali Çekaj was the first commander of the first-two military groups that had conducted military exercises between 1990 and 1991 in Albania. Part of those groups were also Adem Jashari and Zahir Pajaziti. Sali Çekaj since 1991 organized guerrilla attacks on Serbian police stations in many villages in the Dukagjini region. He was also one of the main commanders of the Battle of Košare. He took part also at Battle of Lodja and several battles in the Dukagjini region during the Kosovo War. After his death, he was given the decoration Hero of Kosovo. He was also honored with "The Flag" of Capitol Hill as the National Hero of Kosovo with approval of US senators.

Sali Çekaj was the leader of Dukagjini region and with Adem Jashari as the leader of the Drenica region and Zahir Pajaziti the leader of Llapi region, co-operated in guerrilla attacks on Serbian police stations since 1992. Because of  his national activity he had difficulty staying in Kosovo and was persecuted by Serbian police. Even so, he never stopped working and fighting  for his country to become free and independent. Because of his early national activities during the Kosovo War he had the nickname Veterani (the Veteran).

References

Kosovo Liberation Army soldiers
Military personnel from Peja
1956 births
1999 deaths